= Miyal Syedan =

- Village
- Country: Pakistan
- Province: Punjab
- District: Rawalpindi
- Time zone: UTC+5 (PST)

Miyal Syedan is a village located in Rawalpindi District of Punjab province of Pakistan. It is in Rawalpindi Saddar Tehsil in Chountra region. It is almost 21 kilometers from Chak beli khan and about 75 kilometers from Rawalpindi on Rawalpindi and Chakwal districts boundary.
